Azrikam is a moshav in southern Israel. Located near Ashdod, it falls under the jurisdiction of Be'er Tuvia Regional Council.

Etymology
The village is named after "Azrikam, a descendant of Zerubbabel." (1 Chronicles 3:23)

History
The moshav was established in 1950 on the lands of the depopulated Palestinian village of Bayt Daras, just south of the depopulated Palestinian village of al-Batani al-Gharbi by Jewish refugees from Tunisia. It was initially named Bitanya. In the first few years, the moshav's residents lived in tents without electricity, water or gas.

References

Moshavim
Populated places established in 1950
Populated places in Southern District (Israel)
1950 establishments in Israel
Tunisian-Jewish culture in Israel